Daniel Sartori Bessa (born 14 January 1993) is an Italian Brazilian footballer who plays as a midfielder for Emirati club Al-Ittihad Kalba. He was called up to the Italy national under-18 football team. Bessa qualified for Italian citizenship through his family who have Venetian origins.

Club career

Early career
Bessa started his career in Brazil with Clube Atlético Paranaense. He also played futsal with Coritiba Futsal in 2004.

Internazionale
Inter noticed Bessa when he was playing for Atletico Paranaense's youth team and brought him to Italy in 2008.

2012 was his breakthrough year in the Primavera, being a main reason for Inter winning the NextGen Series, scoring three goals in the tournament and having assisted Samuele Longo's goal in the final. Unfortunately, an eye injury made him unavailable for newly appointed first team coach, former primavera coach Andrea Stramaccioni. He was back in time for the Primavera playoffs. He suffered a knee injury in the final versus Lazio which kept him out for the rest of the year. In November 2012, Bessa's contract with Inter was renewed.

Vicenza (loan)
On 31 January 2013, Bessa was loaned to Vicenza Calcio. He made his Serie B debut for Vicenza on 9 March 2013 in a match against Padova, coming on as a substitute. Having not played regularly for over half a year due to injury, an unfit Bessa didn't get many minutes for a relegation-battling Vicenza side.

Olhanense (loan)
On 15 July 2013, Bessa, along with fellow Inter player Vid Belec, completed a loan to Sporting Clube Olhanense. He made his Primeira Liga debut on 17 August 2013 against Vitoria de Guimaraes. On 27 November, Olhanense coach Paulo Alves announced that Bessa, who had only managed 13 minutes of playing time all season, wasn't part of his plans.

Sparta Rotterdam (loan)
On 22 January 2014, Bessa started training with Eerste Divisie team Sparta Rotterdam. After some injury problems he finally made his Eerste Divisie debut on 9 March, coming on as a substitute in the 54th minute against Jong FC Twente.

Bologna (loan)
On 27 August 2014, Bessa was loaned to Serie B side Bologna. He made his debut as a 74th-minute substitute in the Serie B match against Crotone on 21 September. On 13 December 2014, he scored his first Serie B goal against Frosinone. On 9 June 2015, Bologna were promoted to Serie A, after a 1–1 draw with Pescara in the promotion playoffs. Bessa finished the season with 30 appearances, 1 goal and 3 assists, with 2 being from corners.

Como (loan)
On 6 August 2015, Bessa was signed by Como.

Verona
On 12 August 2016, after representing Inter in pre-season, Bessa joined Hellas Verona on a temporary deal, with an obligation to sign him outright. According to Inter and fcinter1908.it, Bessa was sold for €1.2 million transfer fee.

Genoa (loan)
On 31 January 2018, Bessa was signed by Genoa on loan until 30 June 2019.

UAE
On 16 July 2022, Bessa joined Al-Ittihad Kalba in the United Arab Emirates on a two-year contract.

Playing style
Bessa is a traditional playmaker, whose playing style closely resembles that of a classic number 10; he has been compared to a both Wesley Sneijder and Xavi. Bessa is a technically gifted player and excels at playing behind the strikers. He has a low center of gravity but also has the strength and ability to shield off defenders and protect the ball. Due to his eye for goal, he often alternates between playing as a central attacking midfielder and as a second striker in a 4–4–1–1 formation, a role which is colloquially known as playing "in the hole", and in which he was deployed in the NextGen series. He has also been used in more advanced positions on occasion, as a centre-forward, and his playing style in this role has occasionally been compared with that of Wayne Rooney.

Bessa also has the ability to play in deeper midfield roles, and move up with the play as he dictates it in midfield with his passing, but is also known to be involved more directly in his team's attacking moves. Although he is not known for his speed, his awareness and vision have been highlighted as his best qualities; he has also been noted for his ball control and dribbling skills.

Career statistics 

1

2

3

Honours
Inter Primavera
 NextGen series (1): 2011–12
 League Champion (1): 2011–12

References

External links
 
 Voetbal International profile 
 AIC profile 

Living people
1993 births
Footballers from São Paulo
Association football midfielders
Brazilian footballers
Brazilian people of Italian descent
Brazilian people of Venetian descent
Inter Milan players
L.R. Vicenza players
S.C. Olhanense players
Sparta Rotterdam players
Como 1907 players
Hellas Verona F.C. players
Genoa C.F.C. players
Goiás Esporte Clube players
Al-Ittihad Kalba SC players
Serie A players
Serie B players
Primeira Liga players
Eerste Divisie players
Campeonato Brasileiro Série A players
UAE Pro League players
Brazilian expatriate footballers
Expatriate footballers in Italy
Expatriate footballers in the Netherlands
Expatriate footballers in the United Arab Emirates
Brazilian expatriate sportspeople in Italy
Brazilian expatriate sportspeople in the Netherlands
Brazilian expatriate sportspeople in the United Arab Emirates